Viscount Furness, of Grantley in the West Riding of the County of York, was a title in the Peerage of the United Kingdom. It was created in 1918 for the shipping magnate Marmaduke Furness, 2nd Baron Furness. The title Baron Furness, of Grantley in the West Riding of the County of York, had been bestowed on his father, Christopher Furness, a businessman and Liberal politician. The titles became extinct in 1995 on the death of the first Viscount's only surviving son, William, the second Viscount.

Thelma Furness, Viscountess Furness, second wife of the first Viscount, was an American-born socialite.  The Honourable Christopher Furness, only son of the first Viscount by his first wife, was a recipient of the Victoria Cross. Sir Stephen Furness, 1st Baronet, was the nephew of the first Baron.

Barons Furness (1910)
Christopher Furness, 1st Baron Furness (1852–1912)
Marmaduke Furness, 2nd Baron Furness (1883–1940) (created Viscount Furness in 1918)

Viscounts Furness (1918)
Marmaduke Furness, 1st Viscount Furness (1883–1940)
Hon. Christopher Furness (1912–1940)
William Anthony Furness, 2nd Viscount Furness (1929–1995)

See also
Furness baronets

References

Extinct viscountcies in the Peerage of the United Kingdom
Noble titles created in 1918